Mareike Lotte Wulf (born 15 November 1979 in Rendsburg, Schleswig-Holstein) is a German politician (CDU) and has been a member of the German Bundestag since 2021. From 2017 to 2021, she was a member of the Lower Saxony state parliament.

Life and career
After graduating from the Herbartgymnasium Oldenburg in 1999, Wulf studied cultural studies in Frankfurt (Oder) up to intermediate diploma. Following one year of studies of political science in Lille, France, Wulf graduated with a degree in social science from Humboldt University of Berlin.

Wulf then worked at the Unternehmerverbände Niedersachsen (UVN) (Lower Saxony Business Associations) in Hanover, first as an education officer and later as head of education and social policy. In 2017, she was a member of UVN's management board until she moved into the state parliament, where she was also responsible for the employment market.

Wulf is married.

Political activity
Mareike Wulf entered Lower Saxony politics as a career changer; she stood for election for the first time in the 2017 Lower Saxony state election and with 25.4% was defeated in the constituency of Hannover-Mitte by SPD candidate Alptekin Kırcı, who won 41.4% of the primary vote. Nevertheless, she entered the state parliament via 12th place on the CDU state list. She was the designated Minister of Education in the shadow cabinet of CDU's top candidate Bernd Althusmann; however, following coalition negotiations, this department went to Grant Hendrik Tonne (SPD). Mareike Wulf was elected deputy chairwoman of the CDU parliamentary group in the state parliament with responsibility for the areas of culture and economics. In July 2021, Mareike Wulf was elected chairwoman of the Women's Union of Lower Saxony. In the 2021 German federal election, she stood as a direct candidate in the electoral district Hameln-Pyrmont - Holzminden and in 9th place on the CDU state list of Lower Saxony, which won her a seat in the German Bundestag. She resigned from her state parliament mandate and was succeeded by Colette Thiemann.

References

External links

 Website of Mareike Wulf
 Biography at the German Bundestag
 Mareike Wulf on abgeordnetenwatch.de
 Website of the CDU Lower Saxony on Mareike Wulf

Living people
People from Rendsburg
1979 births
Christian Democratic Union of Germany politicians
21st-century German politicians
Members of the Bundestag 2021–2025
Humboldt University of Berlin alumni